Red Dragon is a psychological horror novel by American author Thomas Harris, first published in 1981. The plot follows former FBI profiler Will Graham, who comes out of retirement to find and apprehend an enigmatic serial killer nicknamed "the Tooth Fairy". The novel introduced the character Dr. Hannibal Lecter, a brilliant psychiatrist and cannibalistic serial killer whom Graham reluctantly turns to for advice and with whom he has a dark past. The title refers to the figure from William Blake's painting The Great Red Dragon and the Woman Clothed in Sun.

The novel was adapted as a film, Manhunter, in 1986, which featured Brian Cox as Lecter (spelled "Lecktor" within the film). Directed by Michael Mann, the film received mixed reviews and fared poorly at the box office. It has since developed a cult following.

After Harris wrote a sequel to the novel, The Silence of the Lambs (1988), itself turned into a highly successful film in 1991, Red Dragon found a new readership. A second sequel, Hannibal, was published in 1999 and adapted into a film in 2001. Both film sequels featured Anthony Hopkins in the role of Hannibal Lecter, for which he won an Oscar for Best Actor in 1991. Due to the success of the second and third films, Red Dragon was remade as a film directed by Brett Ratner in 2002, this time bearing the title of the original novel and with Hopkins playing Lecter. Elements of the novel also influenced the NBC television series Hannibal, while the plot was adapted as the second half of the series' third season.

Plot 
In 1975, Will Graham, a brilliant profiler of the FBI, captured the serial killer Hannibal Lecter. However, Graham suffered serious injuries from the encounter and retired afterward. 5 years later, in 1980, a serial killer nicknamed "The Tooth Fairy" stalks and murders seemingly random families during sequential full moons. He first kills the Jacobi family in Birmingham, Alabama, then the Leeds family in Atlanta, Georgia. Two days after the Leeds murders, agent Jack Crawford, Graham's mentor, goes to Graham's Marathon, Florida residence and pleads for his assistance; Graham reluctantly agrees. After looking over the crime scenes with only minimal insight, Graham realizes he must visit Lecter and seek his help to capture "the Tooth Fairy."

"The Tooth Fairy" is revealed (to the readers) to be the production chief of a St. Louis film processing firm named Francis Dolarhyde. He is a disturbed individual who is obsessed with the William Blake painting The Great Red Dragon and the Woman Clothed in Sun (which the book identifies as The Great Red Dragon and the Woman Clothed with the Sun). Dolarhyde is unable to control his violent, sexual urges, and believes that murdering people—or "changing" them, as he calls it—allows him to more fully "become" an alternate personality he calls the "Great Red Dragon", after the dominant character in Blake's painting. Flashbacks reveal that his sociopathy is born from the systematic abuse he suffered as a child at the hands of both his sadistic grandmother and his family.

As Graham investigates the case, he is hounded by Freddy Lounds, a sleazy tabloid reporter. Meanwhile, Lecter's de facto jailer, Frederick Chilton, discovers Lecter's secret correspondence, with which Lecter gives Graham's address to Dolarhyde. Graham's wife, Molly, and his stepson are evacuated. Graham tries to intercept the secret communication without Lecter's knowledge but instead attracts the attention of Lounds.

Lounds becomes aware of the correspondence and tries to trick Graham into revealing details of the investigation by posing as the Red Dragon but is found out. Hoping to lure the Red Dragon into a trap, Graham gives Lounds an interview in which he deliberately mischaracterizes the killer as an impotent homosexual. This infuriates Dolarhyde, who kidnaps Lounds, forces him to recant the allegations, bites off his lips and sets him on fire, leaving his maimed body outside his newspaper's offices. Lounds is taken to the hospital but dies from his injuries soon afterward.

At about the same time, Dolarhyde falls in love with a blind co-worker named Reba McClane, which conflicts with his homicidal urges. In beginning a relationship with McClane, Dolarhyde resists the Dragon's "possession" of him; he goes to the Brooklyn Museum, beats a museum secretary unconscious, and eats the original Blake watercolor of The Red Dragon.

Graham eventually realizes that the killer knew the layout of his victims' houses from their home movies, which were developed at the same film processing lab. Dolarhyde's job gives him access to all home movies that pass through the company. When he sees Graham interviewing his boss, Dolarhyde realizes that they are on to him and goes to see McClane one last time. He finds her breaking up with her previous boyfriend, Ralph Mandy, to be with Dolarhyde; McClane grants Mandy's request for a final kiss goodbye. Enraged with jealousy, Dolarhyde kills Mandy. He kidnaps McClane and, having taken her to his house, sets the place on fire. He says he intends to kill her and then himself, but finds himself unable to shoot her. The shotgun fires, and a body hits the floor. McClane escapes just before the house explodes. Graham later comforts her, telling her that there is nothing wrong with her and that the kindness and affection she showed Dolarhyde probably saved lives.

Believing Dolarhyde is dead, Graham's family moves back to the Florida home. However, Dolarhyde shows up at the house and after a violent struggle, stabs Graham in the face, leaving him with permanent facial scars, before being fatally shot by Molly. As Graham recovers, Crawford explains what happened. The dead man in Dolarhyde's house was a gas station attendant he'd had an altercation with; Dolarhyde had brought the man's body to his house to stage his own death, using McClane as a witness. Crawford intercepts a letter to Graham from Lecter, which bids him well and hopes that he isn't too disfigured, and destroys it in an incinerator.

During his recovery, Graham has a flashback to a visit he made to Shiloh, the site of a major battle in the American Civil War, shortly after apprehending (and in the process, killing) Garrett Hobbs, a serial killer he investigated before Hannibal Lecter.  Graham has an epiphany about the indifference of nature and decides that it is not nature that is haunted by events, as he had thought when visiting Shiloh before, but men who are haunted.

Characters 

 Will Graham
 Francis Dolarhyde
 Jack Crawford
 Hannibal Lecter
 Freddy Lounds
 Reba McClane
 Ralph Mandy
 Molly Graham
 Willy Graham

Origin
Red Dragon is Thomas Harris's second novel, after Black Sunday. As part of his research for the book he attended classes and talked to agents at the FBI Behavioral Science Unit in Quantico, Virginia, during the late 1970s. He learned about serial killers, offender profiling and the role of the FBI in serial killer investigations. After his father became terminally ill, Harris stayed for 18 months at an isolated shotgun-style house where he worked on the book. The rural setting helped him visualize both the character of Hannibal Lecter and the Leeds murder house depicted in the story. The book is dedicated to his father.

Reception
Thomas Fleming in The New York Times gave the book a generally favorable review. He compared the development of the story to the gradual acceleration of a powerful car, but complained that the explanation for Dolarhyde's behavior, trauma in his youth, was too mechanistic. James Ellroy has described Red Dragon as 'the best pure thriller I've ever read' and cited it as an influence on his own novel Killer on the Road. In a 1981 article for the Washington Post, horror author Stephen King praised it as "probably the best popular novel to be published in America since The Godfather."

Dave Pringle reviewed Red Dragon for Imagine magazine, and stated that "an excellent thriller about a man who murders whole families with the aid of his grandmother's false teeth (I kid not)."

Adaptations 
 The first film, released in 1986 under the title  Manhunter, was written and directed by Michael Mann and focused on FBI Special Agent Will Graham, played by William Petersen. Lecter (renamed Lecktor) was played by Brian Cox. 
 In 1996, Chicago's Defiant Theatre produced a full stage version of the novel at the Firehouse theatre, adapted and directed by the company's artistic director, Christopher Johnson. The production included projected home movies as were described in the novel, including reenacting the violent murders. Dolarhyde's inner dragon was personified by an actor in an elaborate, grotesque costume and seduces the killer to continue on his violent path.
 The second film, which used the title Red Dragon, appeared in 2002. Directed by Brett Ratner and written by Ted Tally (who also wrote the screenplay for The Silence of the Lambs), it starred Edward Norton as Graham and Anthony Hopkins as Lecter.
 Elements from the novel influenced the NBC TV adaptation Hannibal, which first aired in 2013. Graham is played by Hugh Dancy, and Lecter is played by Mads Mikkelsen. Though set in the 2010s, the series begins prior to the events of Red Dragon, reimagining Graham's and Lecter's early encounters during the former's tenure with the FBI and the events following his fatal shooting of Garret Jacob Hobbs. The plot of the novel itself was adapted for the second half of the series' third season, with Richard Armitage cast as Francis Dolarhyde and Rutina Wesley as Reba McClane.

References 

1981 American novels
Fiction set in 1978
Hannibal Lecter novels
American thriller novels
American novels adapted into films
Dell Publishing books
G. P. Putnam's Sons books
Novels about the Federal Bureau of Investigation
Novels about serial killers
Novels set in the 1970s
Novels set in Florida
Novels set in Atlanta
Novels set in Birmingham, Alabama
Novels set in Brooklyn
Novels set in St. Louis